Charles Tomlinson (1808 – 1897), was a scientist who published papers on meteorology and the physical properties of liquids.

Biography
He studied science under George Birkbeck, the founder of the London Mechanics' Institute. For a while, he had a school with his brother Lewis, at Salisbury. Becoming known for original investigation, he was called to London, where he was appointed lecturer on experimental science at King's College School. During the 1840s and 1850s he published several notable scientific works relating to phenomena of the weather for the Society for Promoting Christian Knowledge. In 1872 he was elected to the Royal Society, and in 1874 he took a leading part in founding the Physical Society. As a scientist Tomlinson made valuable contributions to the knowledge of the surface tension of liquids. His last years were devoted to literature, and he held the Dante lectureship at University College 1878–1880. He was also an avid chess player and published a book on this subject, Amusements in Chess, in 1845.

His wife was the author Sarah Windsor Tomlinson who predeceased him in 1872 and was buried on the eastern side of Highgate Cemetery. Charles Tomlinson was later buried in the same grave (plot no.19920), but the grave is now under a footpath and has no headstone.

Publications
He authored over 50 books and 100 published papers and notes, among which were:

 Amusements in Chess (London, 1845)
 The Rain-Cloud: An Account of the Nature, Properties, Dangers, and Uses of Rain in Various Parts of the World (London, 1846)
 Winter in the Arctic Regions: I - Winter in the Open Seas, II - Winter in a Secure Harbour, III - Winter in a Snow-Hut  (London, 1846)
 The Thunder-Storm: An Account of the Properties of Lightning and of Atmospheric Electricity in Various Parts of the World (London 1848).  Includes detailed historic experiences and observations of the effects of thunder and lightning and related effects of electricity in the atmosphere.  The third edition of 1877 adds more recent experiences.
 Cyclopaedia of Useful Arts and Manufactures (1852–1854, supplement 1862, expanded edition 1866)
 The Dew-drop and the Mist: An Account of the Phenomena and Properties of Atmospheric Vapour in Various Parts of the World, (London, 1860)
 The Tempest: An Account of the Origin and Phenomena of Wind in Various Parts of the World (London)
 Natural Phenomena (London, 1861)
 The magnet : familiarly described; and illustrated by a box of magnetic toys (1861)
 A Rudimentary Treatise on Warming and Ventilation (1864)
 The Rain-Cloud and The Snow-Storm: an Account of the Nature, Formation, Properties, Dangers, and Uses of Rain and Snow (London, 1865)
 The Sonnet, Its Origin, Structure, and Place in Poetry (1874)
 A translation of Dante Aligheri's Inferno (1877)
 The Literary History of the Divine Comedy (1879)
 a volume of original Sonnets (1881)
 Dante, Beatrice, and the Divine Comedy (1894)

Written with his wife Sarah Tomlinson:
  Lessons From the Animal World (London)

Notes

References

External links

 
 
 
 The life and work of Charles Tomlinson FRS: a career in Victorian science and technology

1808 births
1897 deaths
English scientists
English translators
Translators of Dante Alighieri
Fellows of the Royal Society
Academics of University College London
Burials at Highgate Cemetery
19th-century British translators
English male poets
19th-century English poets
19th-century English male writers
English male non-fiction writers